The Short Track Speed Skating World Cup is a series of international short track speed skating competitions, organised yearly by the International Skating Union since the winter of 1998/1999. Every year during the winter, a number of competitions on a number of different distances are held. Skaters can earn points at each competition and the skater who has the most points on a given distance at the end of the series is the winner.

Overall World Cup winners

Men

*no results available
*Thibaut Fauconnet was disqualified after failing doping tests.
Medals:

World Cup Results - Country Medal Table

Women 

*no results available
Medals:
World Cup Results - Country Medal Table

Mixed 

Medals:

All-time medal count
The all-time medal count is updated as at 2022-23 season.

Crystal Globe Awardees

Medal count

See also
Short track speed skating
World Short Track Speed Skating Championships
World Cup Ranking statistics

References

External links
World Short Track
International Skating Union

 
Short track speed skating competitions
Short track
International Skating Union competitions